Richard Hageman (9 July 1881 – 6 March 1966) was a Dutch-born American conductor, pianist, and composer.

Biography 
Hageman was born and raised in Leeuwarden, Friesland, Netherlands. He was the son of Maurits Hageman of Zutphen, a violinist, pianist and conductor, and of Hester Westerhoven of Amsterdam, a singer who performed under the name Francisca Stoetz. A child prodigy, he was a concert pianist by the age of six. He studied at the conservatories of Amsterdam and Brussels. As a young man he was an accompanist for singers and with the Nederlandsche Opera, which he conducted for the first time in 1899. He became the artistic director briefly in 1903, the same year he married the soprano Rosina van Ophemert, who took the stage name Rosina van Dyke/van Dyck (Rosina van Dijk was the maiden name of her grandmother). For a short time he was accompanist to Mathilde Marchesi in Paris. He travelled to the United States in 1906 to accompany Yvette Guilbert on a national tour. He stayed and eventually became an American citizen in 1925. Rosina sang at the Metropolitan Opera, but the couple had an acrimonious divorce in 1916. His second and third wives were also singersRenee Thornton and Eleanore Rogers.

He was a conductor and pianist for the Metropolitan Opera between 1908 and 1922, and 1935-1936, coach of the opera department at the Curtis Institute from 1925 to 1930, and music director of the Chicago Civic Opera and the Ravinia Park Opera for seven years. Hageman also taught vocal and piano at the Chicago Musical College in the 1920s, where one of his notable piano students was Ray Turner, who went on to play with the Paul Whiteman Orchestra, worked as the staff pianist at Paramount Studios for over 20 years, and was a popular recording and concert artist. 

Hageman was a guest director of orchestras like the Chicago, Philadelphia, and Los Angeles symphony orchestras. He conducted the Philadelphia Orchestra summer concerts for four years, and from 1938-1943 he conducted at the Hollywood Bowl summer concerts.

He is known to the film community for his work as an actor and film score composer, most notably for his work on several John Ford films in the late 1930s and after the war in the late 1940s. He shared an Academy Award for his score to Ford's 1939 western Stagecoach. He played minor roles in eleven movies, for example as opera conductor Carlo Santi in The Great Caruso. He became a member of ASCAP in 1950.

Hageman also composed more serious vocal music. His 1931 opera Caponsacchi, first performed in Freiburg with the title Tragödie in Arezzo in 1932, was staged at the Metropolitan Opera in 1937 with Mario Chamlee in the title role. His "concert drama" The Crucible was performed in Los Angeles in 1943.  While his large musical compositions are rarely heard today, a few of his art songs are well-known and highly regarded, especially "Do Not Go, My Love", a setting of a Rabindranath Tagore poem.

He was a National Patron of Delta Omicron, an international professional music fraternity.  He died, aged 84, in Beverly Hills.

Larger musical works and chamber music 

Stage:
Caponsacchi (Op. 3, R. Browning), 1931
I Hear America Call (ballad, R.V. Grossman), Bar, SATB, orch, 1942
The Crucible (oratorio, B.C. Kennedy), 1943
Orchestra:
Overture 'In a Nutshell'; Suite, str
Chamber:
October Musings, violin and piano, G. Schirmer, 1937
Recit and Romance, vc, pf, 1961

Published songs 
Do Not Go, My Love (Rabindranath Tagore), Winthrop Rogers/G. Schirmer, 1917
May Night (Tagore), 1917
The Cunning Little Thing (Unknown Author), Winthrop Rogers, 1917
At the Well (Tagore), Winthrop Rogers/G. Schirmer, 1919
Happiness (Jean Ingelow), Winthrop Rogers/G. Schirmer, 1917/1920
Charity (Emily Dickinson), G. Schirmer, 1921
Nature's Holiday (T. Nash), 1921
Ton coeur est un tombeau (Jacques Boria), G. Schirmer 1921
Animal Crackers (C. Morley), G. Schirmer, 1922
Evening (Anonymous text), Ricordi, 1922
Christ Went Up Into the Hills (Katherine Adams), Carl Fischer, 1924
Me Company Along (James Stephens), Carl Fischer, 1925
Grief (Ernest Dowson), Carl Fischer, 1928
Dawn shall over Lethe Break (Hilaire Belloc), Boosey & Hawkes, 1934
The Donkey (G. K. Chesterton), Boosey & Hawkes, 1934
The Little Dancers (Laurence Binyon), Boosey & Hawkes, 1935
The Night Has a Thousand Eyes (F. W. Bourdillon), Boosey & Hawkes, 1935
Christmas Eve, A Joyful Song (Joyce Kilmer), Galaxy, 1936 (arranged for mixed chorus by Philip James, Galaxy, 1937)
The Rich Man (Franklin P. Adams), Galaxy, 1937
Song without Words (vocalise for coloratura voice with piano), Carl Fischer, 1937
This Thing I do: a soliloquy for baritone voice with piano accompaniment (Arthur Goodrich), Carl Fischer, 1937
Music I Heard with You (Conrad Aiken), Galaxy, 1938
Sundown (Lew Sarett), Carl Fischer, 1938 and 1942
To a Golden-haired girl (Vachel Lindsay), Carl Fischer, 1938
Miranda (Hilaire Belloc), Galaxy, 1940
Mother (Margaret Widdemer), Galaxy, 1940
Love in the winds (Richard Hovey), Galaxy, 1941
Little Things (Witter Bynner), Galaxy, 1943
Voices (Witter Bynner), Galaxy, 1943
Don Juan Gomez (Elizabeth Jane Coatsworth), Galaxy, 1944
Fear not the Night (Robert Nathan), Carl Fischer, 1944
Lift Thou the Burdens, Father, a sacred song (Katherine Call Simonds), Galaxy, 1944
En una noche serena/Alone in the night (Andres de Segurola, tr. Robert B. Falk), Galaxy, 1945
Contrasts (Elizabeth Jane Coatsworth), Galaxy, 1946
The Fiddler of Dooney (William Butler Yeats), G. Schirmer, 1946
A Lady comes to an Inn (Elizabeth Jane Coatsworth), Galaxy, 1947
The Fox and the Raven (Guy Wetmore Carryl), Galaxy, 1948
The Summons (Tagore), Galaxy, 1949
Is it you? (Robert Nathan), Galaxy, 1951
Trade Winds (John Masefield), Galaxy, 1952
Scherzetto (Alfred Kreymborg), Galaxy, 1952
All Paths Lead to you (Blanche Shoemaker Wagstaff), Galaxy, 1953
Let me Grow Lovely (Karle Wilson Baker), Carl Fischer, 1953
Sleep Sweet (Ellen Huntington Gates), Galaxy, 1953
Walk slowly (Adelaide Love), Carl Fischer, 1953
I see His Blood upon the Rose (Joseph M. Plunkett), Galaxy, 1954
Velvet Shoes (Elinor Wylie), Galaxy, 1954
How to go and Forget (Edwin Markham), G. Schirmer, 1956
Praise (Seumas O'Sullivan), G. Schirmer, 1956
Under the Willows: Shoshone love song (Mary Hunter Austin), G. Schirmer, 1957
When the Wind is Low (Cale Young Rice), Galaxy, 1957
Die Stadt/The Town (Theodor Storm, tr. Robert Nathan), G. Schirmer, 1958
Betterliebe/Beggar's Love (Theodor Storm, tr. Robert Nathan), G. Schirmer, 1958
Am Himmelstor/At Heaven's Door (Conrad F. Meyer, tr. Robert Nathan), G. Schirmer, 1958
Nocturne (Jean Moréas, tr. Robert Nathan), G. Schirmer, 1960
So love returns, (Robert Nathan), Ricordi, 1960

Film scores 
Hageman is credited for the scores of about 20 films, and his compositions have been used in many additional films.

Seven of the scores were for films directed by John Ford; Kathryn Marie Kalinak has written that Ford "got great work out of the people he worked with, and often those he was hardest on produced the best work of their careers. One of those was Richard Hageman, the Philadelphia Orchestra notwithstanding."

Stagecoach (1939)
The Howards of Virginia (1940)
The Long Voyage Home (1940)
The Frozen Ghost (1945)
The Fugitive (1947)
Fort Apache (1948)
3 Godfathers (1948)
She Wore a Yellow Ribbon (1949)
Wagon Master (1950).
Adventure in Vienna (1952)

Footnotes

References

External links 

 
Richard Hageman Society
 

1881 births
1966 deaths
20th-century American composers
20th-century classical composers
20th-century American conductors (music)
American classical pianists
American male classical pianists
American film score composers
American male classical composers
American male conductors (music)
ASCAP composers and authors
Best Original Music Score Academy Award winners
Conservatorium van Amsterdam alumni
Dutch classical pianists
Dutch conductors (music)
Dutch emigrants to the United States
Dutch film score composers
Dutch male classical composers
Dutch classical composers
People from Leeuwarden
Royal Conservatory of Brussels alumni
20th-century classical pianists
American male film score composers
20th-century American male musicians
20th-century American pianists